Lex Baillie (born 6 July 1966) is a Scottish former professional footballer who played as a central defender. Born in Hamilton, Baillie played for Burnbank Boys Club, Celtic, St Mirren and Dunfermline Athletic. After retiring as a player, Baillie became a police officer, and was the subject of a 2007 TV documentary.

Baillie is the son of sports journalist and former Rangers player, Doug Baillie.

Playing career
Baillie signed for Celtic from Burnbank Boys Club in August 1982. After several years in the youth team and reserves, he made his first team debut on 22 December 1987 in a 2–0 away win over Falkirk in the league. Baillie went on to make 13 appearances in the league that season (1987–88) for Celtic, playing in 2-0 (at Parkhead) and 2-1 (at Ibrox) wins over Rangers, and helped the club to the League Championship title. 

In 1990, he played for the Toronto Blizzard in the Canadian Soccer League.

Baillie failed to establish himself as a regular in the team after that though, and eventually joined St Mirren in June 1991 for a fee of £90,000. He spent two seasons at Love Street before being released in the summer of 1993. Baillie then signed for Dunfermline in August 1993 on a one-year contract, before retiring from football at the end of that season.

References

1966 births
Living people
Scottish footballers
Celtic F.C. players
Toronto Blizzard (1986–1993) players
St Mirren F.C. players
Dunfermline Athletic F.C. players
Scottish Football League players
Canadian Soccer League (1987–1992) players
Association football defenders
Scottish expatriate footballers
Scottish expatriates in Canada
Expatriate soccer players in Canada